Philipp Freiherr von Boeselager (6 September 1917 – 1 May 2008) was the second-last surviving member of the 20 July Plot, a conspiracy of Wehrmacht officers to assassinate the German dictator Adolf Hitler in 1944.

Early life

Born at Burg Heimerzheim, near Bonn, he was the fifth and the second surviving son of the nine children of Albert Dominikus Hyacinthus Antonius Johannes Hubertus Vitus Joseph Maria Freiherr von Boeselager (Bonn 15 June 1883-Heimerzheim, Kr. Euskirchen 20 May 1956), by his wife (they married in Kassel on 22 September 1910), Maria-Theresia Ferdinandine Antonie Alonsia Freiin von Salis-Soglio (1890–1968), daughter of Anton Joseph Alonsius Nepomuk Stanislaus Maria Freiherr v. Salis-Soglio (1860–1939), of Gemünden and Mandel, Kreuznach, by Maria Adelheid Theresia Gräfin von Bissingen und Nippenburg (daughter of Ernst Maria Ferdinand Adam Johann Nepomuk Joseph Graf von Bissingen-Nippenburg). He attended Aloisius Jesuit secondary school Aloisiuskolleg in Godesberg.

Role in conspiracy against Hitler
When Boeselager was a 25-year-old field lieutenant, he was part of Operation Walküre, a plan developed to take control of Germany once Hitler had been assassinated. Boeselager's role in the plan was to order his troops, who were unaware of the plot, to leave the front lines in Eastern Europe and to head west, where they would be airlifted to Berlin to seize crucial parts of the city in a full-scale coup d'état after Hitler had been killed.

Boeselager's opinion turned against the Nazi government in June 1942, after he received news that five Roma people had been shot in cold blood solely because of their ethnicity. Together with his commanding officer, Field Marshal Günther von Kluge, he joined a conspiracy to assassinate Hitler. The first attempt was in March 1943, when both Hitler and Heinrich Himmler were coming to the front to participate in a strategy meeting with Kluge's troops.

Boeselager was given a Walther PP with which he was to shoot both Hitler and Himmler at a dinner table in the officers' mess. However, nothing ever came of this plan because at the last minute, Himmler left Hitler's company, and the risk of leaving him alive to succeed Hitler was too great.

The second assassination attempt was in summer 1944. No longer caring about Himmler, the conspiracy planned to kill Hitler with a bomb when he was attending another strategy meeting in a wooden barracks. When the assassin's bomb failed to kill the Führer, Boeselager was informed in time to turn his unexplained cavalry retreat around and return to the front before suspicions could be aroused. Because of Boeselager's fortunate timing, his involvement in the operation went undetected, and he was not executed, unlike the majority of the conspirators. Philipp's brother Georg was also a participant in the plot, and likewise remained undetected, but was later killed in action on the Eastern Front.

Shortly before the end of the war, Boeselager overheard General Wilhelm Burgdorf saying, "When the war is over, we will have to purge, after the Jews, the Catholic officers in the army". The devoutly-Catholic Boeselager noisily objected, citing his own decorations for heroism in combat. Boeselager then left before Burgdorf could respond.

Postwar life
After the war, Boeselager's part in the failed attempt on Hitler's life became known. He was regarded as a hero by many in Germany and France and received the highest military medals that both countries could provide. He studied economics and became a forestry expert. Even in his old age, Boeselager still had nightmares about the conspiracy and the friends whom he lost during the war. He urged young people to become more involved in politics, as he felt apathy and the political inexperience of the German masses had been two of the key reasons why Hitler was able to come to power. The entrance to his residence in Kreuzberg bears the Latin motto Et si omnes ego non ("even if all, not I").

Boeselager was a member of K.D.St.V. Ripuaria Bonn, a Roman Catholic student fraternity at the University of Bonn that now belongs to the Cartellverband der katholischen deutschen Studentenverbindungen. Until his death on 1 May 2008, he still had the Walther PP pistol he was given to use to shoot Hitler.

On 18 April 2008, just two weeks before his death, Philipp von Boeselager gave his last videotaped interview, which was conducted by Zora Wolter for the feature documentary The Valkyrie Legacy. It was televised on The History Channel in spring 2009 to coincide with the release of the film Valkyrie, starring Tom Cruise and directed by Bryan Singer. The documentary was produced by Singer and directed by Kevin Burns.

Ewald-Heinrich von Kleist-Schmenzin was the last survivor of the 20 July plot until his death on 8 March 2013.

Marriage
Boeselager married Rosa Maria, born Gräfin von Westphalen zu Fürstenberg (1924 - 2014). Albrecht von Boeselager (born 4 October 1949, Altenahr), former Grand Chancellor of the Sovereign Military Order of Malta, is their child.

Honours 

 Iron Cross (1939) 1st (1941) and 2nd class (1940)
 Knight's Cross of the Iron Cross on 20 July 1944 as Major and commander of the I./Kavallerie-Regiment Mitte
 Eastern Front Medal
 Wound Badge in Silver (1944)
 General Assault Badge
 Close Combat Clasp in Bronze
 Honour Roll Clasp of the Army (1944)
 Grand Cross of the Order of Merit of the Federal Republic of Germany (Großes Bundesverdienstkreuz des Verdienstordens der Bundesrepublik Deutschland, 1989)
 Officier de la Légion d'honneur (2004)

See also
Assassination attempts on Adolf Hitler

References

Citations

Bibliography

 Antonius John: Philipp von Boeselager – Widerstand und Gemeinwohl. Bouvier-Verlag, Bonn 2007 
 Bernheim, Robert: "Assassinating Hitler: The Last Plotter," The Dorchester Review, Vol. 1, No. 1, Spring-Summer 2011, pp. 5–15.
 Ulrich Cartarius: Opposition gegen Hitler. Deutscher Widerstand 1933–1945. Berlin 1984, 
 
 Kaltenbrunner-Berichte an Bormann und Hitler über das Attentat vom 20. Juli 1944, in: Hans-Adolf Jacobsen (Hrsg.): Spiegelbild einer Verschwörung. Stuttgart 1961
 von Boeselager, Philipp. Valkyrie: the Plot to Kill Hitler. London: Weidenfeld & Nicolson. 2008.
 Der 20. Juli 1944. Ein Zeitzeuge berichtet (Hörbuch), Philipp Freiherr von Boeselager. Interview: Prof. Hans Sarkowicz. Doppel-CD. Audiobuch Verlag, Freiburg i. Br. 2004, 
 Philipp Freiherr von Boeselager 80 Jahre, in: Holz-Zentralblatt, 123. Jahrgang, Folge 107/1997, S. 1524, 
 Ilkka Ahtiainen, Hitlerin murhaaja. Helsingin Sanomat monthly supplement, August 2007.
 
 Fabian von Schlabrendorff, German Officers Against Hitler, Deutsche Offiziere gegen Hitler, Zurich, 1948.

External links 
 
 „Der letzte Zeuge“, Focus, 15. November 2007
 „Du kannst ihn stoppen – also bitte!“ WDR, 28. December 2005, incl. live recordings
 Mein Weg zum 20. Juli. – Die Einsamkeit des Widerstands, 2004, Speech at the Bavarian Parliament.
 Boeselager als Unterzeichner des Appells der Jungen Freiheit anlässlich der Leipziger Buchmesse, 17. February 2006
 Boeselager: Appell für Lebensschutz und gegen Abtreibung, Front page of "Junge Freiheit", 22. September 2006
 "Philipp Von Boeselager: Last of the Conspirators in the July 20 Plot to Assassinate Hitler, whose Role Remained Undetected until After the War," The Daily Telegraph (London). May 3, 2008.
 Grimes, William. "Philipp von Boeselager, Who Attempted an Assassination of Hitler, Dies at 90," New York Times. May 3, 2008.

Interviews
An interview with von Boeselager
 A last Interview. „Ich hätte ihn erschießen können“, FAZ, published 1. May 2008
 „Philipp Freiherr von Boeselager, Widerstandskämpfer“, Conversation, 8. March 2008, incl. Audio-file, 44 Min.
 Interview, Junge Freiheit, 20. July 2007
 „Der letzte Überlebende des 20. Juli. Wir wollten den Judenmord stoppen“, FAZ, 20. July 2007
 „Der Mut des Gewissens“, SZ, 19. July 2004
 Interview mit Philipp von Boeselager, geschichts.net, December 2005
 „Wir wollten das Reich retten“, Junge Freiheit, 18. July 2003

1917 births
2008 deaths
People from Rhein-Sieg-Kreis
People from the Rhine Province
Philipp
Barons of Germany
Members of the 20 July plot
Roman Catholics in the German Resistance
Recipients of the Knight's Cross of the Iron Cross
Commanders Crosses of the Order of Merit of the Federal Republic of Germany
Officiers of the Légion d'honneur
Failed assassins of Adolf Hitler
Failed assassins of Heinrich Himmler
Military personnel from North Rhine-Westphalia